Sir Laurence Whistler Street,  (3 July 1926 – 21 June 2018) was the 14th Chief Justice of the Supreme Court of New South Wales and Lieutenant-Governor of New South Wales. He was the third generation of the Street family to serve in these viceregal offices and the youngest since 1844. Street fought in World War II and became a commander in the Royal Australian Navy Reserve and an honorary colonel in the Australian Army Reserve. 

Following his retirement from the bench, Street became the chairman of Fairfax Media and a director of Banca Monte dei Paschi di Siena, the oldest bank in the world. He chaired the integration of protocols between the Australian Federal Police and the Australian Security Intelligence Organisation, and he chaired naval warship acquisitions. He pioneered alternative dispute resolution, worked prolifically in mediation, and he ascertained the return to Australia of the remains of 17 Indigenous Australians from the National History Museum in London, the first such mediation.

Early life and family
Street was born in Sydney, New South Wales, the son of Kenneth Whistler Street and Jessie Street ( Lillingston). He was the grandson of Sir Philip Whistler Street. Both his father and grandfather were Chief Justices of the Supreme Court of New South Wales and Lieutenant-Governors of New South Wales before him. His mother Jessie was a prominent suffragette, the daughter of Charles Alfred Gordon Lillingston,   (great-grandson of Sir George Grey, 1st Baronet) and Mabel Harriet Ogilvie, who was in turn the daughter of Australian politician Edward David Stuart Ogilvie. He attended the Cranbrook School. At age 17, he joined the Royal Australian Navy and was deployed to fight in the Second World War. Returning from the war, he graduated from Sydney Law School.

Career
Street became a barrister at the New South Wales Bar in 1951. As a barrister, he practised extensively in equity, commercial law and maritime law. In 1965, he was appointed as a judge of the New South Wales Supreme Court in the Equity Division. In 1974, at age 47, Street became the youngest Chief Justice since 1844. In 1976 he was appointed a Knight Commander of the Order of St Michael and St George. He retired in 1988 and was appointed Companion of the Order of Australia in 1989.

Following his retirement from the bench, Street became a director and later chairman of Fairfax Media and a director of Monte dei Paschi di Siena, the oldest bank in the world. He also held office as Australian and world president of the International Law Association, London of which he was a life vice president. He was a member of several professional organisations, including an Honorary Fellow of the Australian Institute of Building and an Honorary Member of the Society of Construction Law Australia. He was a patron of the Jessie Street National Women's Library and the Jessie Street Trust, which uphold his mother's legacy in women's rights and Indigenous Australian rights. In 1986 he became the first patron of Australian Dispute Resolution Association, and from 1989, he worked prolifically in mediation and alternative dispute resolution. This work included 1,500 mediations, mainly in major commercial disputes. 

In 2007, Street led the review of a decision by Queensland's Director of Public Prosecution in the 2004 case of an Indigenous Australian death in custody, and conducted the first mediation over the return to Australia of Indigenous Australian remains from the National History Museum in London. In 2008, he chaired the integration of procedural protocols between the Australian Federal Police, the Australian Security Intelligence Organisation and the Commonwealth Director of Prosecutions, and chaired an inquiry into the Defence Force Disciplinary System. In 2005, he oversaw the Defence Department's $8 billion air warfare destroyer project.

Family
Sir Laurence's first wife was Susan Gai Watt,  (formerly Lady Street; born 1932), who graduated from the University of New South Wales and was the first female chair of the Eastern Sydney Health Service. She is the daughter of Ruth Edmunds Massey and Ernest Alexander Stuart Watt, a shipping heir by whom she is the niece of Lieutenant Colonel Walter Oswald Watt, the granddaughter of Australian politician John Brown Watt, and the great-granddaughter of Australian politician George Kenyon Holden. Sir Laurence's sister Philippa married the Australian Test cricketer Jack Fingleton, . By Susan, Sir Laurence had four children: Kenneth, Sylvia, Alexander and Sarah. Kenneth Street is a businessman with three children by his wife Sarah Street (née Kinross). Sylvia Emmett (née Street),  is a federal judge and a lieutenant commander of the Royal Australian Naval Reserve. She graduated from Sydney Law School (LLB) and is married to Arthur Emmett,  a federal judge and Challis Lecturer in Roman Law at Sydney Law School. Alexander "Sandy" Street,  is also a federal judge and a commander of the Royal Australian Naval Reserve. He has four children by two wives. Sarah Farley (née Street) graduated from Sydney Law School (LLB) and has four children by her husband, financier Gerard Farley. Sir Laurence's only child by his second wife and widow Lady (Penelope; née Ferguson) Street is Jessie Street, a graduate of Sydney Law School (JD) and the god-daughter of King Charles III.

Death and legacy
Street died on 21 June 2018 and had a state funeral at the Sydney Opera House in July 2018. In an elegy before 700, Australian Prime Minister Malcolm Turnbull spoke of his mentor: "As a barrister, he was as eloquent as he was erudite, as formidable as he was fashionable […] Laurence had movie star good looks coupled with a charisma, charm and intellect, a humility, a humanity that swept all before him […] His nickname, 'Lorenzo the Magnificent', was well earned." Turnbull recalled how Street had provided a reference for him to attain a Rhodes Scholarship. Chief Justice of New South Wales Tom Bathurst remembered him as "one of the outstanding jurists of the 20th century."

References

 

1926 births
2018 deaths
Chief Justices of New South Wales
Lieutenant-Governors of New South Wales
Judges of the Supreme Court of New South Wales
Australian Knights Commander of the Order of St Michael and St George
Companions of the Order of Australia
Australian King's Counsel
People educated at Cranbrook School, Sydney
Royal Australian Navy officers
Royal Australian Navy personnel of World War II
Laurence
Presidents of the International Law Association